Festival Ballet Providence is a ballet company located in Providence, Rhode Island, United States. Festival Ballet performs at Providence Performing Arts Center, Veterans Memorial Auditorium (Providence, Rhode Island), and their own Black Box Theatre.

History 
The company was founded in 1978 by Christine Hennessey and Winthrop Corey, former principal dancers with the Royal Winnipeg Ballet.  After the death of Hennessey in 1998, Mihailo Djuric took over as Artistic Director, and led the company until 2020.

Leadership 
Artistic Director: Mihailo Djuric (1998-2020)
Executive Director: Kathleen Breen Combes (2019-present)

Festival Ballet also runs the Festival Ballet Providence School.
School Director: Vilia Putrius (2018-2020)

References

External links
 

Ballet companies in the United States
Performing arts in Rhode Island
Dance in Rhode Island
Performing groups established in 1978